Calliotropis acherontis is a species of sea snail, a marine gastropod mollusk in the family Eucyclidae.

Description

Distribution
This marine species occurs off East Australia, New Zealand, the Kermadec Islands and New Caledonia.

References

 Marshall B. A. (1979). The Trochidae and Turbinidae of the Kermadec Ridge (Mollusca: Gastropoda). New Zealand Journal of Zoology 6: 521–552-page(s): 529
 Vilvens C. (2007) New records and new species of Calliotropis from Indo-Pacific. Novapex 8 (Hors Série 5): 1–72

External links

acherontis
Gastropods described in 1979